
Gmina Czarnków is a rural gmina (administrative district) in Czarnków-Trzcianka County, Greater Poland Voivodeship, in west-central Poland. Its seat is the town of Czarnków, although the town is not part of the territory of the gmina.

Villages
Gmina Czarnków contains the villages and settlements of Białężyn, Brzeźno, Bukowiec, Ciążyń, Ciszkowo, Gajewo, Gębice, Gębiczyn, Góra nad Notecią, Goraj-Zamek, Grzępy, Huta, Hutka, Jędrzejewo, Komorzewo, Kuźnica Czarnkowska, Marunowo, Mikołajewo, Paliszewo, Pianówka, Radolinek, Radosiew, Romanowo Dolne, Romanowo Górne, Sarbia, Sarbka, Śmieszkowo, Sobolewo, Średnica, Walkowice and Zofiowo.

Neighbouring gminas
Gmina Czarnków is bordered by the town of Czarnków and by the gminas of Budzyń, Chodzież, Lubasz, Połajewo, Ryczywół, Trzcianka, Ujście and Wieleń.

References
Polish official population figures 2006

Czarnkow
Czarnków-Trzcianka County